The 2019 Blackpool Council election took place on 2 May 2019 to elect members of Blackpool Council in England.

Blackpool Council had been controlled by the Labour Party since 2011, which held a majority of ten with 26 councillors. The Conservatives were defending twelve seats, and independent councillors were defending four.

Background 
Blackpool Council held local elections on 2 May 2019 along with councils across England as part of the 2019 local elections. The council elects its members in all-out elections, with all its councillors up for election every four years. Councillors defending their seats in this election were previously elected in 2015. In that election, 29 Labour councillors and 13 Conservative councillors were elected.

The Conservative Party held its seat in Warbreck ward following a March 2017 by-election.

Following suspension by the Conservative Party, Colin Maycock left his party to sit as an independent councillor in November 2017.

Follow complaints about comments he made at an event in March 2018, Ian Coleman resigned as mayor, left the Labour group on the council, and said he wouldn't stand for re-election. His son and daughter-in-law, Labour councillors Gary Coleman and Debbie Coleman, left their party in June 2018 to sit as independents. Debbie Coleman had been deselected, and Gary Coleman had announced he wouldn't seek re-election. The three councillors formed a new group called the Independent Blackpool Residents Group.

Two Conservative councillors including former council leader Peter Callow were deselected by their party.

Summary

Election result

|-

Council composition
After the previous election, the composition of the council was:

Immediately ahead of this election, the composition of the council was:

Following the latest election, the current composition of the council is:

Ward results

Incumbent councillors seeking re-election are marked with an asterisk (*). Two sitting councillors—Debbie Coleman and Andrew Stansfield—are seeking election in different wards.

Anchorsholme

Bispham

Bloomfield

Brunswick

Claremont

Clifton

Greenlands

Hawes Side

Highfield

Ingthorpe

Layton

Marton

Norbreck

Park

Squires Gate

Stanley

Talbot

Tyldesley

Victoria

Warbreck

Waterloo

References

2019 English local elections
2019
2010s in Lancashire
May 2019 events in the United Kingdom